Ezekiel Handinawangu Guti (born 5 May 1923) is popularly referred to as the founder of Zimbabwe Assemblies of God Africa (ZAOGA), however Guti has always maintained that "This church is not mine - it belongs to God."

Zaoga was founded in 1960.

There is also a common misconception that Zaoga 'broke away' from AFM. That has never been the case. Guti had joined an AFM branch but left after being used mightily of God at the time, and was pushed out by senior pastors who feared that Guti will one day take the assembly and its congregants. Hence Guti, under a call from God, established Zaoga in Bindura, Zimbabwe, under a gum tree, in 1960.

ZAOGA is also known internationally as Forward in Faith Ministries International and is headquartered in Waterfalls, Harare, Zimbabwe.  In the United Kingdom, Zaoga is now known as Forward In faith Church International Incorporated (FIFCII)

A gifted evangelist, Prof E.H. Guti has distinguished himself as a leading personality in the Pentecostal world. He oversees over 5000 pastors and evangelists worldwide, who regard him as a unique prophet, apostle and a loving father.

Early years 

Guti was born in Ngaone, Chipinge, Manicaland Province, Rhodesia (now Zimbabwe) on 5 May 1923.

The church is established in over 164 nations and states, with over 2,000 churches in Southern Africa. Guti has now ministered for 74 years and has spoken in several countries. He founded seven Bible colleges named Africa Multi-Nation For Christ College, with three in Zimbabwe, two in Mozambique, one each in Zambia and Ghana.  He has also founded various ministries including Forward in Faith Children’s Home, Children's Ministry, Forward in Faith Christian College (Christ for Zimbabwe college secondary school), Africa Christian Business Fellowship, the Gracious Women's Fellowship, along with the Husband's Agape International Fellowship. He has written over 113 books on his teachings.

Church ministry 

The ministry was begun under a gum tree on 12 May 1960 in Bindura, Zimbabwe.

On the international arena, Guti has accepted invitations to preach in several African nations as well as in Europe, the United States, Asia-Pacific countries, and the Bahamas, and has spoken in Bible schools, colleges, universities, and on television and radio programmes.

Education 

Guti's academic credentials include BA; MA; DD; D.Min and a Ph.D in Religion. He holds a Bachelor of Christian Education and a Doctorate from Northgate Graduate School and Zoe College, U.S.A.

He initiated the building of Zimbabwe Ezekiel Guti University in Bindura-Zimbabwe (for which there was some controversy regarding land acquisition), and the Mbuya Dorcas Hospital in Waterfalls-Harare.

Personal life and family 

Guti is married to archbishop and prophetess Eunor Guti. Their son, Ezekiel, who suffered from speech impairment and physical disabilities, drowned in a swimming pool in December 2017.

Books 
 Two Ways of Knowing God
 Effective Preaching that Draws People to God
 Foundations: Exploration of Bible Doctrinal Study (Protection Against Hearsay)
 Guidance and foundations of a Praying Church
 The manager who lost his Job due to false accusation
 Saved Baptized and filled with the Holy Ghost
 Sunday Morning Bible Study
 Talents

About 
African Apostle by Gayle Erwin
The Remained Unspoken of the African Apostle by Robert Takavarasha
African Gifts of the Spirit by David Maxwell
 Ezekiel Guti, A Portrait of Leadership by Samuel Mayinoti
More than 50 books are also written by Prophet Ezekiel Guti

References 

 http://www.fifmi.org - Forward in Faith Ministries International official website.
 Erwin, Gayle D.  African Apostle. Servant Quarters. Cathedral City, CA. 1985.
 Mayinoti, S. Ezekiel Guti A Portrait of Leadership, Africa Blossom. Windhoek, 2021.
 Maxwell, David.  African Gifts of the Spirit.  Ohio University Press. Athens, Ohio. 2006
 Maxwell, David.  Wise man.Ohio University Press. Athens, Ohio. 2006

1923 births
Living people
Assemblies of God people
People from Manicaland Province
Rhodesian Protestant clergy
Zimbabwean Christian religious leaders
Zimbabwean evangelicals
Zimbabwean Protestant ministers and clergy